Side by Side: The True Story of the Osmond Family is a 1982 American made-for-television biographical film about the earlier years of the famed entertainment family, starring Marie Osmond as matriarch Olive Osmond, and Joseph Bottoms as patriarch George Osmond. This film was released on VHS tape in 1998 but has never had an official DVD issue.

Side by Side would be followed 19 years later by Inside the Osmonds, which focuses on the family's breakthrough years as pop stars with an entirely new cast.

Plot
The film focuses on the early life of the Osmond Brothers and how they became successful musicians. It also highlights the origins of their parents George Osmond and Olive Davis from as early as World War II. The Osmond's voices are heard on songs such as "I'm a Ding Dong Daddy from Dumas", "I Wouldn't Trade The Silver In My Mother's Hair", "Be My Little Baby Bumble Bee", and "Side by Side".

At the end of the film, the video of the Osmonds singing "Side by Side" on The Andy Williams Show in 1962 is shown briefly, followed by a montage of vintage photos clips of the family. As the montage progresses, more clips of the family are shown over the years, leading up to the present timeframe. Also, the song turns to a newly-updated show-stopping version of "Side by Side", performed by the Osmonds (including Donny, Marie and Jimmy) on stage. Their parents (played by themselves) are watching in attendance and admiring their performance.

Cast
 Marie Osmond as Olive Osmond
 Joseph Bottoms as George Osmond
 Karen Alston as Belva
 Cheryl Chase as Marianne (credited as Cheryl Hudock)
 Scott Wilkinson as Lt. Goetz
 David Eaves as Virl
 Shane Chournos as Tom
 Daryl Bingham as Young Alan
 Todd Dutson as Alan
 Brian Poelman as Young Wayne
 Vince Massa as Wayne
 Spencer Alston as Young Merrill
 Shane Wallace as Merrill
 Jason Sanders as Young Jay
 Jeremy Haslam as Jay
 Jamon Rivera as Young Donny

In addition to Marie Osmond, other members of The Osmond family including:
 Travis Osmond (Merrill Osmond's son) as Young Virl
 Justin Osmond (Merrill Osmond's son) as Young Tom; Justin who was born deaf like his uncles Virl and Tom
 Amy Osmond (Wayne Osmond's daughter) as Young Marie

Production
Parts of the film were shot in Orem, Utah, at Osmond Studios.

References

External links
 
 

1982 television films
1982 films
1980s biographical films
Osmond family (show business)
American biographical films
Biographical films about entertainers
Films set in Utah
Films set in the 1940s
Films set in the 1950s
Films set in the 1960s
NBC network original films
Films directed by Russ Mayberry
1980s English-language films
1980s American films